Alan Leslie Lerwill (15 November 1946 – 6 February 2021) was a male British international long jumper.

Athletics career
He competed in the 1968 Summer Olympics and in the 1972 Summer Olympics, coming seventh in the latter. He represented England and won a bronze medal in the 1970 British Commonwealth Games long jump, and gold medal in the 1974 British Commonwealth Games. He also competed in the triple jump in both of those games, and set a British high jump record of 2.10m in 1973.

References

1946 births
2021 deaths
Olympic athletes of Great Britain
Athletes (track and field) at the 1968 Summer Olympics
Athletes (track and field) at the 1972 Summer Olympics
Commonwealth Games gold medallists for England
Athletes (track and field) at the 1974 British Commonwealth Games
Sportspeople from Portsmouth
English male long jumpers
Athletes (track and field) at the 1970 British Commonwealth Games
Commonwealth Games medallists in athletics
Universiade medalists in athletics (track and field)
Universiade gold medalists for Great Britain
Medalists at the 1970 Summer Universiade
Medallists at the 1970 British Commonwealth Games
Medallists at the 1974 British Commonwealth Games